Mary Scanlon may refer to:
 Mary Scanlon (Scottish politician), member of the Scottish Parliament
 Mary Gay Scanlon, U.S. Representative from Pennsylvania
 Mary Scanlon (New Jersey politician), member of the New Jersey General Assembly